Jean-Sylvain Claude Babin (born 14 October 1986) is a professional footballer who plays as a centre-back for Spanish club AD Alcorcón.

He all but spent his professional career in Spain, appearing for Granada and Sporting de Gijón in La Liga and Alcorcón and Sporting in the Segunda División.

Born in metropolitan France, Babin represented the Martinique national team at international level.

Club career

France
Born in Corbeil-Essonnes, Essonne, Babin graduated from LB Châteauroux's youth academy, and made his senior debut with their B team. He started playing as a professional in the 2003–04 season, appearing with the main squad in Ligue 2.

Babin was loaned to FC Martigues on 30 August 2007. After his contract expired, he left Châteauroux.

Spain
On 14 July 2008, Babin moved to Spain and joined Lucena CF in Segunda División B. He was regularly used by the Andalusians during his stint, being an important defensive unit in the 2009–10 campaign.

On 2 August 2010, Babin signed with AD Alcorcón, recently promoted to Segunda División. He made his debut for the Madrid club late in the month, starting in a 1–1 away draw against Albacete Balompié.

Babin scored his first goal for the Alfareros on 22 October 2011, the winner in a 2–1 home win over Recreativo de Huelva. He added a further four during the season, as his team missed out on promotion in the play-offs.

On 9 June 2014, Babin signed a four-year contract with Granada CF. He made his debut in La Liga on 23 August, and scored to help the hosts come from behind and win 2–1 against Deportivo de La Coruña.

On 4 August 2016, Babin agreed to a three-year deal with fellow league side Sporting de Gijón. He scored once in 22 appearances in his first year, as the Asturians were relegated after finishing third-bottom.

Babin was loaned to Maccabi Tel Aviv F.C. of the Israeli Premier League in September 2017; the previous month, he had seen his request for an improved contract denied and was also transfer-listed.

On 24 June 2022, Babin returned to Alcorcón after eight years. He scored on his debut on 28 August, opening the 1–1 draw at Pontevedra CF in the Primera Federación.

International career
Babin chose to represent Martinique internationally. He earned his first cap during the 2013 CONCACAF Gold Cup, playing the full 90 minutes and helping to a 1–0 group-stage defeat of Canada.

Career statistics

Scores and results list Martinique's goal tally first, score column indicates score after each Babin goal.

Honours
Maccabi Tel Aviv
Toto Cup: 2017–18

References

External links

1986 births
Living people
People from Corbeil-Essonnes
French people of Martiniquais descent
French footballers
Martiniquais footballers
Footballers from Essonne
Association football defenders
Ligue 2 players
Championnat National players
LB Châteauroux players
FC Martigues players
La Liga players
Segunda División players
Segunda División B players
Primera Federación players
Lucena CF players
AD Alcorcón footballers
Granada CF footballers
Sporting de Gijón players
Israeli Premier League players
Maccabi Tel Aviv F.C. players
Martinique international footballers
2013 CONCACAF Gold Cup players
2014 Caribbean Cup players
2019 CONCACAF Gold Cup players
2021 CONCACAF Gold Cup players
French expatriate footballers
Martiniquais expatriate footballers
Expatriate footballers in Spain
Expatriate footballers in Israel
French expatriate sportspeople in Spain
French expatriate sportspeople in Israel
Martiniquais expatriate sportspeople in Spain
Martiniquais expatriate sportspeople in Israel